

Australia
 Christmas Island
Administrator – Rendle McNeilage Holten, Administrator of Christmas Island (1980–1982)
 Cocos (Keeling) Islands
Administrator – Charles Ivens Buffett, Administrator of Cocos (Keeling) Islands (1977–1981)
Council Chairman –
 Parson bin Yapat, Chairman of the Cocos Islands Council (1979–1981)
 Wahin bin Bynie, Chairman of the Cocos Islands Council (1981–1983)
 Norfolk Island
 Administrator –
 Peter Coleman, Administrator of Norfolk Island (1979–1981)
 Ian Hutchinson, Acting Administrator of Norfolk Island (1981)
 Thomas Ferguson Paterson, Acting Administrator of Norfolk Island (1981–1982)
 Chief Minister – David Buffett, Chief Minister of Norfolk Island (1979–1986)

Denmark
 Faroe Islands
High Commissioner –
 Leif Groth, High Commissioner in the Faroe Islands (1972–1981)
 Niels Bentsen, High Commissioner in the Faroe Islands (1981–1988)
 Prime Minister –
 Atli Dam, Prime Minister of the Faroe Islands (1970–1981)
 Pauli Ellefsen, Prime Minister of the Faroe Islands (1981–1985)
 Greenland
High Commissioner – Torben Hede Pedersen, High Commissioner in Greenland (1979–1992)
 Prime Minister – Jonathan Motzfeldt, Prime Minister of Greenland (1979–1991)

France
 French Polynesia
 High Commissioner –
 Paul Cousseran, High Commissioner of the Republic in French Polynesia (1977–1981)
 Paul Noirot-Cosson, High Commissioner of the Republic in French Polynesia (1981–1983)
 Mayotte
 Prefect –
 Philippe Jacques Nicolas Kessler, Prefect of Mayotte (1980–1981)
 Pierre Sevellec, Prefect of Mayotte (1981–1982)
 President of the General Council – Younoussa Bamana, President of the General Council of Mayotte (1976–1991)
 New Caledonia
 High Commissioner –
 Claude Charbonniaud, High Commissioner of New Caledonia (1978–1981)
 Christian Nucci, High Commissioner of New Caledonia (1981–1982)
 Saint Pierre and Miquelon
 Prefect –
 Clément Bouhin, Prefect of Saint Pierre and Miquelon (1979–1981)
 Claude Guyon, Prefect of Saint Pierre and Miquelon (1981–1982)
 President of the General Council – Albert Pen, President of the General Council of Saint Pierre and Miquelon (1968–1984)
 Wallis and Futuna
 Administrator-Superior – Robert Thil, Administrator Superior of Wallis and Futuna (1980–1983)
 President of the Territorial Assembly – Manuele Lisiahi, President of the Territorial Assembly of Wallis and Futuna (1978–1984)

New Zealand
 Cook Islands
 Queen's Representative – Sir Gaven Donne, Queen's Representative of the Cook Islands (1975–1984)
 Prime Minister – Tom Davis, Prime Minister of the Cook Islands (1978–1983)
 Niue
 New Zealand Representative – Terry Baker, New Zealand Representative in Niue (1979–1982)
 Premier – Robert Rex, Premier of Niue (1974–1992)
 Tokelau
 Administrator – Frank Corner, Administrator of Tokelau (1975–1984)

Portugal
 Macau
 Governor –
 Melo Egídio, Governor of Macau (1979–1981)
 José Carlos Moreira Campos, Acting Governor of Macau (1981)
 Vasco de Almeida e Costa, Governor of Macau (1981–1986)

South Africa
 South West Africa
Administrator-General – Danie Hough, Administrator-General of South West Africa (1980–1983)
Premier – Dirk Mudge, Chairman of the Council of Ministers of South West Africa (1980–1983)

United Kingdom
 Anguilla
 Governor – Charles Harry Godden, Governor of Anguilla (1978–1983)
 Chief Minister – Ronald Webster, Chief Minister of Anguilla (1980–1984)
Antigua 
gained independence as Antigua and Barbuda on 1 November 1981
Governor – Sir Wilfred Jacobs, Governor of Antigua (1967–1981)
Premier – Vere Bird, Premier of Antigua (1976–1994)
Belize 
gained independence on 21 September 1981
Governor – Sir James Patrick Ivan Hennessy, Governor of Belize (1980–1981)
Premier – George Cadle Price, Premier of Belize (1961–1984)
 Bermuda
 Governor – Sir Richard Posnett, Governor of Bermuda (1980–1983)
 Premier – David Gibbons, Premier of Bermuda (1977–1982)
 British Virgin Islands
 Governor – James Alfred Davidson, Governor of the British Virgin Islands (1978–1982)
 Chief Minister – Lavity Stoutt, Chief Minister of the British Virgin Islands (1979–1983)
 Brunei
High Commissioner – Arthur Christopher Watson, British High Commissioner in Brunei (1978–1984)
Monarch – Hassanal Bolkiah, Sultan of Brunei (1967–present)
 Chief Minister –
 Pengiran Dipa Negara Laila Diraja Pengiran Abdul Mumin, Chief Minister of Brunei (1972–1981)
 Pehin Orang Kaya Laila Wijaya Dato Haji Abdul Aziz Umar, Acting Chief Minister of Brunei (1981–1983)
 Cayman Islands
 Governor – Thomas Russell, Governor of the Cayman Islands (1974–1982)
 Falkland Islands
 Governor – Rex Hunt, Governor of the Falkland Islands (1980–1982)
 Gibraltar
 Governor – Sir William Jackson, Governor of Gibraltar (1978–1982)
 Chief Minister – Sir Joshua Hassan, Chief Minister of Gibraltar (1972–1987)
 Guernsey
 Lieutenant-Governor – Sir Peter Le Cheminant, Lieutenant-Governor of Guernsey (1980–1985)
 Bailiff – Sir John Loveridge, Bailiff of Guernsey (1973–1982)
 Hong Kong
 Governor – Sir Murray MacLehose, Governor of Hong Kong (1971–1982)
 Isle of Man
 Lieutenant-Governor – Sir Nigel Cecil, Lieutenant-Governor of Man (1980–1985)
 Head of Government –
 Clifford Irving, Chairman of the Executive Council of the Isle of Man (1977–1981)
 Percy Radcliffe, Chairman of the Executive Council of the Isle of Man (1981–1985)
 Jersey
 Lieutenant-Governor – Sir Peter Whiteley, Lieutenant-Governor of Jersey (1979–1985)
 Bailiff – Sir Frank Ereaut, Bailiff of Jersey (1975–1985)
 Montserrat
 Governor – David Kenneth Hay Dale, Governor of Montserrat (1980–1984)
 Chief Minister – John Osborne, Chief Minister of Montserrat (1978–1991)
 Pitcairn Islands
 Governor – Sir Richard Stratton, Governor of the Pitcairn Islands (1980–1984)
 Mayor – Ivan Christian, Magistrate of the Pitcairn Islands (1975–1984)
 Saint Christopher and Nevis
 Governor –
 Sir Probyn Ellsworth-Innis, Governor of Saint Christopher and Nevis (1975–1981)
 Clement Arrindell, Governor of Saint Christopher and Nevis (1981–1995)
 Premier – Kennedy Simmonds, Premier of Saint Christopher and Nevis (1980–1995)
 Saint Helena and Dependencies
 Governor –
 Geoffrey Colin Guy, Governor of Saint Helena (1976–1981)
 Sir John Dudley Massingham, Governor of Saint Helena (1981–1984)
 Turks and Caicos Islands
 Governor – John Clifford Strong, Governor of the Turks and Caicos Islands (1978–1982)
 Chief Minister – Norman Saunders, Chief Minister of Turks and Caicos Islands (1980–1985)

United States
 American Samoa
Governor – Peter Tali Coleman, Governor of American Samoa (1978–1985)
 Guam
 Governor – Paul McDonald Calvo, Governor of Guam (1979–1983)
 Puerto Rico
 Governor – Carlos Romero Barceló, Governor of Puerto Rico (1977–1985)
 Trust Territory of the Pacific Islands
 High Commissioner –
 Adrian P. Winkel, High Commissioner of the Trust Territory of the Pacific Islands (1977–1981)
 Janet J. McCoy, High Commissioner of the Trust Territory of the Pacific Islands (1981–1987)
 Northern Mariana Islands (autonomous territory)
 Governor – Carlos S. Camacho, Governor of the Northern Mariana Islands (1978–1982)
Marshall Islands (autonomous territory)
President – Amata Kabua, President of the Marshall Islands (1979–1996)
Federated States of Micronesia (autonomous territory)
President – Tosiwo Nakayama, President of the Federated States of Micronesia (1979–1987)
Palau (autonomous territory)
President – Haruo Remeliik, President of Palau (1981–1985)
 United States Virgin Islands
 Governor – Juan Francisco Luis, Governor of US Virgin Islands (1978–1987)

Colonial governors
Colonial governors
1981